In the United States, emergency medical services (EMS) provide out-of-hospital acute medical care and/or transport to definitive care for those in need. They are regulated at the most basic level by the National Highway Traffic Safety Administration, which sets the minimum standards that all states' EMS providers must meet, and regulated more strictly by individual state governments, which often require higher standards from the services they oversee.

Wide differences in population density, topography, and other conditions can call for different types of EMS systems; consequently, there is often significant variation between the Emergency Medical Services provided in one state and those provided in another.

Organization and funding

Land ambulance

EMS delivery in the US can be based on various models.  While most services are, to some degree, publicly funded, the factor which often differentiates services is the manner in which they are operated. EMS systems may be directly operated by the community, or they may fall to a third-party provider, such as a private company. The most common operating models in the U.S. include:

Publicly operated EMS

In one of the more common publicly operated models, an EMS system is operated directly by the municipality it services.  The services themselves may be provided by a local government, or may be the responsibility of the regional (or state) government.  Municipality-operated services may be funded by service fees and supplemented by property taxes.  In many such cases, the EMS system is considered to be too small to operate independently, and is organized as a branch of another municipal department, such as the Public Health department.  In small communities that lack a large population or tax-base, such a service may not be able to operate unless it is staffed by community volunteers.  In these cases, the volunteer squad may receive some funding from municipal taxes, but is generally heavily reliant on voluntary donations to cover operating expenses.  This provides a significant challenge for volunteer groups, since the training standards for staff must be met, and the vehicle and equipment standards adhered to, while the group does all or most of its own fundraising.  Without the presence of dedicated volunteers, however, many small communities in America might be without local EMS systems and would either have no service at all or be forced to rely on service from more distant communities.

Another operating model for publicly operated EMS is what is generally referred to in the industry as the "third service" option.  In this option, rather than being an integral part of (or in some cases, an "add-on" to) one of the traditional "emergency" services (fire and police), the service is organized as a separate, free-standing, municipal department, with organization that may be similar to, but operated independently from, either the fire or police departments. In a variant of this model, the EMS system may be recognized as a legitimate third emergency service, but provided under a contractual agreement with another organization, such as a private company or a hospital, instead of direct operation.  This model is sometimes referred to as the "public utility" model.  This may be a cost-saving measure, or it may be because the community feels that they lack the resident expertise to deal with medical oversight and control issues, and the legal requirements that typically surround an Emergency Medical Service.

In yet another model for publicly operated EMS, the system may be integrated into the operations of another municipal emergency service, such as the local fire department or police department.  This integration may be partial or complete.  In the case of partial integration, the EMS staff may share quarters, administrative services, and even command and control with the other service.  In the case of full integration, the EMS staff may be fully cross-trained to perform the entry-level function of the other emergency service, whether firefighting or policing.  Many communities perceive this as providing "added value" to the community, since municipal workers are fulfilling more than one function, and are less likely to be idle.

Private/for profit EMS

Ambulance services operating on a private/for profit basis have a long history in the U.S. Often, particularly in smaller communities, ambulance service was seen by the community as a lower priority than police or fire services, and certainly nothing that should require public funding. Until the professionalization of emergency medical services in the early 1970s, one of the most common providers of ambulance service in the United States was a community's local funeral home. This occurred essentially by default, as hearses were the only vehicles at the time capable of transporting a person lying down. Funeral home ambulance operations were sometimes supplemented by "mom and pop" operations, which were not affiliated with funeral homes but rather operated on much the same basis as a taxi service. There were no national standards for ambulance services and staff generally had little, if any, medical training or equipment, leading to a high pre-hospital mortality rate. Such companies continue to operate this way in some locations, providing non-emergency transport services, fee-for-service emergency service, or contracted emergency ambulance service to municipalities, as in the public utility model. During the late 1970s and early 1980s, more than 200 private ambulance companies in the U.S. were gradually merged into large regional companies, some of which continue to operate today. As this trend continued, the result was a few remaining private companies, a handful of regional companies, and two very large multinational companies which currently dominate the entire industry. These services continue to operate in some parts of the U.S., either on a fee-for-service basis to the patient, or by means of contracts with local municipalities.  Such contracts usually result in a fee-for-service operation which is funded by the municipality on a supplementary basis, in exchange for formal guarantees of adequate performance on such issues as staffing, skill sets, resources available, and response times.

Model of care
The Emergency Medical Service system in the United States typically follows the Anglo-American service delivery model (bringing the patient to the hospital), as opposed to the Franco-German model (bringing the hospital to the patient).  Apart from a handful of doctors who work on Medevac aircraft or perform training or medical quality assurance, it is extremely uncommon to see a physician deliberately responding to the scene of an emergency.

Air ambulance

Air ambulance services in the United States can be operated by a variety of sources. Some services are hospital-operated, while others may be operated by Federal, State or local government; or through a variety of departments, including local or State police, the United States National Park Service, or fire departments.  Such services may be operated directly by any of these EMS systems, or they may be contracted to a third-party provider, such as an aircraft charter company.  In addition, it is not uncommon for U.S. military helicopters to be pressed into service providing air ambulance support.  The vast distances covered by the U.S. mean that while helicopters may be the preferred form of service delivery for "on-scene" emergencies, fixed wing aircraft, including small jets, are often used for transfers from rural hospitals to tertiary care sites.  These aircraft are typically staffed by a mix of personnel including physicians, nurses, and paramedics, and in some cases, by all three. Publicly operated air ambulance service is supplemented by emergency and non-emergency air transport service, which may be provided by dedicated air ambulance companies, or by aircraft charter companies as a secondary business operation. 3

History

Pre-modern
Grady ambulance service in the United States began in Atlanta, Georgia in 1869. Grady Memorial Hospital staff rode in horse-drawn carriages designed specifically for transporting the sick and injured.

The first volunteer rescue squads organized around 1920 in Roanoke, Virginia, Palmyra, New Jersey, and along the New Jersey coast. Gradually, especially during and after World War II, hospitals and physicians faded from prehospital practice, yielding in urban areas to centrally coordinated programs. These were often controlled by the municipal hospital or fire department. Sporadically, funeral home hearses, which had been the common mode of transport, were being replaced by fire department, rescue squad, and private ambulances.

Prior to the 1970s, ambulance service was largely unregulated. While some areas ambulances were staffed by advanced first-aid-level responders, in other areas, it was common for the local undertaker, having the only vehicles in town in which a person could lie down, to operate both the local furniture store (where he would make coffins as a sideline) and the local ambulance service.

Development of modern practices

The 1966 release of the National Highway Traffic Safety Administration's study, "Accidental Death and Disability: The Neglected Disease of Modern Society", (known in the EMS trade as the White Paper) prompted a concerted effort was undertaken to improve emergency medical care in the pre-hospital setting. The study found many unnecessary deaths could be prevented through a combination of community education, stricter safety standards, and better pre-hospital treatments.

Freedom House Ambulance Service was the first emergency medical service in the United States to be staffed by paramedics with medical training beyond basic first aid.

In the late 1960s, Dr. R Adams Cowley was instrumental in the creation of the country's first statewide EMS program, in Maryland. The system was called the Division of Emergency Medical Services (now known as the Maryland Institute for Emergency Medical Services and Systems). Also in 1969, Cowley obtained a military helicopter to assist in rapidly transporting patients to the Center for the Study of Trauma (now known as the R Adams Cowley Shock Trauma Center), a specialized hospital that he had started for the purpose of treating shock. This service was not only the first statewide EMS program, but also the beginning of modern emergency medical helicopter transport in the United States.

The first civilian hospital-based medical helicopter program in the U.S., Flight For Life Colorado, began in 1972 with a single Alouette III helicopter, based at St. Anthony Central Hospital in Denver, Colorado.

National EMS standards for the US are determined by the U.S. Department of Transportation and modified by each state's Department of EMS (usually under its Department of Health), and further altered by Regional Medical Advisory Committees (usually in rural areas) or by other committees, or even individual EMS providers.  In addition, the National Registry of Emergency Medical Technicians an independent body, was created in 1970 at the recommendation of President Lyndon B. Johnson in an effort to provide a nationally accepted certification for providers and a nationwide consensus on protocols. Currently, National Registry certification is accepted in some parts of the U.S., while other areas still maintain their own, separate protocols and training curricula.

In particular, in the US state of California, in Seattle, Washington state (Medic One), and in Miami, projects began to include paramedics in the EMS responses in the early 1970s.  Groups in Pittsburgh, Pennsylvania, Charlottesville, Virginia and Portland, Oregon were also early pioneers in pre-hospital emergency medical training.  Despite opposition from firefighters and doctors, the program eventually gained acceptance as its effectiveness became obvious.

Furthermore, such programs became widely popularized around North America in the 1970s with the NBC television series, Emergency!  which, in part, followed the adventures of two Los Angeles County Fire Department paramedics as they responded to various types of medical emergency.  James O. Page served as the series technical adviser and went on to become integral in the development of EMS in the U.S. The popularity of this series encouraged other communities to establish their own equivalent services.

Shortages

In the 21st century, rural communities with declining populations have had more problems finding EMS volunteers, as the local population skews older and has more health problems. From 2005 to mid-2019, 160 rural hospitals closed, many in states that did not expand Medicare as part of the Affordable Care Act, leading to longer drive times for EMS.

The COVID-19 pandemic in the United States caused a major increase in job danger, job stress, and employee turnover, causing a national shortage of EMS workers. Compounding the problem was a temporary shutdown of training, recruitment by hospitals for nursing staff, and increased pay in other occupations experiencing a labor shortage and not subject to government reimbursement limits.

Standards

Training and certification

The original lines that delineated an EMT from a Paramedic and a Paramedic from a doctor are becoming increasingly blurred. Skills that were once reserved for physicians are now routinely performed by paramedics, and skills once reserved for paramedics, such as defibrillation, are now routinely performed by Basic Emergency Medical Technicians (EMTs). However, there is wide variation among states, and even among counties within states, of what type of care providers at different levels are allowed to provide. In addition to these variations, some states and counties allow for add-ons, such as defibrillation or IV therapy, which enable workers at a lower level to learn and use additional skills that would not normally be within the scope of practice of their qualification level (for example, an EMT is not generally permitted to start an IV, but after successfully completing an IV add-on course, he or she would then be able to do so.) Add-on skills are generally more common in rural areas where definitive care is further away geographically and immediate interventions by EMTs are beneficial for patient care.

A basic listing of qualification levels:
Emergency Medical Responder (EMR): EMRs, many of whom are volunteers, provide basic, immediate care including bleeding control, CPR, AED, and emergency childbirth. An EMR, with the help of an EMT, can assume care for a patient while that patient is being transported.
Emergency Medical Technician (EMT): EMT includes all EMR skills, advanced oxygen and ventilation skills, pulse oximetry, noninvasive blood pressure monitoring, and administration of certain medications.
Advanced Emergency Medical Technician (AEMT): AEMT includes all EMT skills, advanced airway devices, intravenous and intraosseous access, blood glucose monitoring, and administration of additional medications.
 Paramedic (see Paramedics in the United States): Paramedic is specialist health care provider, autonomous practitioner , providing advanced assessment and management skills, various invasive skills, and extensive pharmacology interventions, Paramedic is the highest level in EMS and its extension to the emergency physician .

Reciprocity - that is, recognition of one state's EMT certification being valid in another state - between states is somewhat limited, and after 30 years of operation by the National Registry of Emergency Medical Technicians, only about 40 states provide unlimited recognition of the NREMT certifications.  In reality, there are at least 40 types of certification for EMS personnel within the United States, and many of these are recognized by no more than a single state.  This creates significant challenges for the career mobility of many EMS providers, as they must often re-sit certification examinations each time they move from one state to another.

Staffing

Ambulances in the United States must be staffed with a minimum of 2 personnel. The level of crew certification varies depending on the jurisdiction the ambulance is operating in. In most areas, the bare minimum is an EMT to provide patient care and an EMR to assist and drive the unit. This set-up would be classified as a Basic Life Support Unit (BLS) due to the fact that the highest ranking provider cannot perform Advanced Life Support (ALS) interventions. If patient condition warrants, an ALS provider may be summoned to assist and meet the ambulance en route to the hospital. Other staffing combinations include one EMT and one paramedic (the most common arrangement), or two Paramedics, which are classified in most areas as an Advanced Life Support Unit (ALS). Unlike in Europe, Emergency Physicians do not regularly practice in the field, and only crew ambulances for specialty situations, such as extreme-low-weight infant transports, ECMO or cardiac bypass transports, or unusual situations such as crush injuries necessitating field amputation, or mass casualty/disaster situations.

Funding and manpower models
EMS is sometimes provided by volunteers. Agencies that were once strictly volunteer have begun supplementing their ranks with compensated members in order to keep up with booming call volumes. As of 2004, the largest "Private Enterprise" provider of contract EMS services in North America was American Medical Response, based in Greenwood Village, Colorado.  The second-largest US EMS provider is Rural/Metro Corporation, based in Scottsdale, Arizona; Rural/Metro Corporation also provides EMS services to parts of Latin America.  Like AMR, Rural/Metro provided other transportation services, such as non-emergency transport and "coach", or wheelchair, transportation. On October 28, 2015, AMR announced that it had finalized the acquisition of Rural/Metro, forming the largest EMS organization in the United States and employing nearly 25,000 individuals.

Many colleges and universities now also have their own EMS agencies.  Collegiate EMS programs vary somewhat from university to university; however, most agencies are fully staffed by student volunteers. Agencies might operate what is called a Quick Response Service (which does not transport patients but acts as a first responder to scenes) providing initial patient assessment and care, or they might operate certified ambulance services staffed with EMTs or Paramedics. Some groups limit services to within their campus, while others extend services to the surrounding community. Services provided by college and university agencies may include ambulance services, mass-casualty incident response, aero-medical services, and search-and-rescue teams.
    
While fire service in the US is rated based on ISO classes, and fire insurance rates (casualty insurance) are based on those classes, EMS does not receive ratings, nor are there corresponding monetary savings in health or life insurance policies. Unlike fire and police protection, which are recognize as an essential services by the Federal Government, it has been left to local governments to determine if emergency medical services are necessary for their communities. This lack of federal recognition as an essential service has left emergency medical services grossly underfunded throughout the United States, leading to service closures and gaps in coverage for citizens throughout the country.

Medical control
EMS providers work under the authority and indirect supervision of a medical director, or board-certified physician who oversees the policies and protocols of a particular EMS system or organization.  Both the medical director and the actions he or she undertakes are often referred to as "Medical Control".

Equipment and procedures are necessarily limited in the pre-hospital environment, and EMS professionals are trained to follow a formal and carefully designed decision tree (more commonly referred to as a "protocol") which has been approved by Medical Control. This protocol helps ensure a consistent approach to the most common types of emergencies the EMS professional may encounter.  Medical Control may take place on-line, with the EMS personnel having to contact the physician for direction delegation  for all Advanced Life Support (ALS) procedures, or off-line, with EMS personnel performing some or all of their ALS procedures on the basis of protocols or "standing orders". The NHTSA curriculum remains the Standard of Care for EMS organizations in the US.

Vehicles

Ambulances

Ambulances in the United States are defined by federal KKK-1822 Standards requirements, which define several categories of ambulances. In addition, most states have additional requirements according to their individual needs. 
 Type I Ambulances are based on the chassis-cabs of light duty pickup-trucks,
 Type II Ambulances are based on modern passenger/cargo vans, referred to in the industry as Vanbulances.
 Type III Ambulances are based on chassis-cabs of light duty vans,
AD (Additional Duty) versions of both Type I and Type III designs are also defined.  They include increased GVWR, storage and payload capacity.

Large American cities like New York and Los Angeles tend to have many distinct ambulance services, each with its own paint scheme and using all of the ambulance types mentioned above. Pedestrians and drivers in such cities must be alert for ambulances of many shapes, sizes, and colors. Most ambulances certified for emergency response in the U.S. are marked with the Star of Life for ready identification by the public.

Ambulances may be supplemented or supported by vehicles that lack the capacity to transport a patient.  The most common of these vehicles is known by several names, including "response car". Response cars are often equipped with much of the same equipment carried by an ambulance, but, since they are SUVs or large cars, they are often faster and nimbler. Response cars are staffed by one or more medical providers, and are used variously as a source of additional (or more skilled) manpower, as a supervisor's vehicle, or as a first response vehicle, enabling medical treatment to begin before the arrival of the ambulance.

Dispatch
In the United States, there are as many methods of dispatching EMS resources as there are approaches to providing EMS service.  In some larger communities, EMS may be self-dispatching.  Where EMS is operated as a division of the Police or Fire Departments, it will generally be dispatched by those organizations.  Dispatching may occur through state-licensed EMS dispatch centers, which are operated by one service but provide dispatch to several counties.  In large centers, such as New York City, the statutory EMS provider (in the case of NYC, the FDNY) will dispatch not only their own vehicles, but also EMS resources belonging to hospitals, private companies, and even volunteers, within their own community.  The national emergency number in the United States is 9-1-1.  The number works for all three emergency services.  In most cases, a 9-1-1 call will be answered at a central facility, usually referred to as a Public Safety Answering Point, and operated, in most cases, by the police.  The needs of the caller are identified, and the call is routed to the dispatcher for the emergency service(s) required.

While some small communities continue to use "low-tech" approaches to dispatch, in many places in the U.S. the technology is quite advanced.  Advanced technologies in use may include electronic mapping, Global Positioning System (GPS) or its first cousin Automatic vehicle location (AVL).  The use of decision support software such as AMPDS is also common, as are surveillance "add-ons".  As a result, many dispatchers are trained to a high level in their own right, triaging incoming calls by severity, and providing advice or medical guidance by telephone prior to the arrival of the ambulance or rescue squad on the scene.  Some are certified as EMTs or paramedics in their own states, and increasingly, are becoming certified as Emergency Medical Dispatchers.

Response times
There is no official Federal or State standard for response times in the United States. Response time standards frequently do exist in the form of contractual obligations between communities and EMS provider organizations, however.  As a result, there is typically considerable variation between standards in one community and another.  New York City, for example, mandates a 10-minute response time on emergency calls, while some communities in California have moved response time standards to 12–15 minutes. It is generally accepted within the field that an "ideal" response time for emergency calls would be within eight minutes, ninety-percent of the time, but this objective is rarely achieved, and current research results question the validity of that standard.  As call volumes increase and resources and funding fail to keep pace, even large EMS systems such as Pittsburgh, Pennsylvania struggle to meet these standards. Individuals who live in rural areas far from emergency services also may expect a longer wait due to the distance involved.  This issue is further complicated by differing performance measurement methodologies. Some services count response time beginning at the moment that the telephone call is answered and running until an ambulance or response resource arrives at the scene, while others measure only the time from the notification of EMS personnel of the call, which is considerably shorter.  Another issue which arises in urban areas is that the response time "clock" almost universally stops when the unit arrives in front of the address; in large office or apartment buildings, actually accessing the patient may take several minutes longer, but this is not considered in response time calculation or reporting.

See also

9-1-1
Ambulance
Certified first responder
List of EMS provider credentials
Emergency Medical Services
Emergency Medical Dispatcher
Emergency medical technician
Emergency medical responder levels by state
Emergency medicine
Friendly caller program
Paramedics in the United States
Paramedic
The White Paper

References

External links
History of Emergency Medical Services
HISTORY OF EMERGENCY MEDICAL SERVICES (EMS)
 National Registry of Emergency Medical Technicians
 National Association of Emergency Medical Technicians
 National Volunteer Fire Council - EMS/Rescue Section
 National Highway Traffic Safety Agency, Office of Emergency Medical Services
 The Difference Between an EMT and a Paramedic
 How Pittsburgh's Freedom House Pioneered Paramedic Treatment